Gerald Lewis (born March 25, 1971) is an American retired basketball player. A 1.90 m guard, he led the Euroleague in steals during the 1998–99 season with 2.5 per game. It was his first and last participation in the competition, playing for KK Zadar.

Lewis is a 1989 graduate of St. Martin's Episcopal School in Metairie, Louisiana. He was inducted into the school's Alumni Athletic Hall of Fame in 2011. From 1989 to 1993, Lewis played for the SMU Mustangs men's basketball team.

Lewis has also worked as an assistant coach for the New Mexico State Aggies and Southeastern Louisiana Lions. He coached at David W. Carter High School before joining St. Augustine High School.

External links 
Fibaeurope.com profile
New Mexico State University profile

References 

1971 births
Living people
American expatriate basketball people in Croatia
American expatriate basketball people in Slovakia
Basketball players from New Orleans
Guards (basketball)
KK Zadar players
New Mexico State Aggies men's basketball coaches
New Mexico State University alumni
SMU Mustangs men's basketball players
Southeastern Louisiana Lions basketball coaches
Sportspeople from New Orleans
American men's basketball players